Delia Juanita Warrick (September 25, 1942 – October 18, 2008), known professionally as Dee Dee Warwick, was an American soul singer. Born in Newark, New Jersey, she was the sister of singer Dionne Warwick, the niece of Cissy Houston, and a first cousin of singers Whitney Houston and Leontyne Price.

Early life
Warwick was born in East Orange, New Jersey, to Mancel Warrick (1911–1977), who began his career as a Pullman porter and subsequently became a chef, a gospel record promoter for Chess Records and later a Certified Public Accountant; and Lee Drinkard-Warrick (1920–2005), manager of The Drinkard Singers.  Warwick had one sister, Dionne Warwick, and a brother, Mancel Jr, who was killed in an accident in 1968 at the age of 21.. She was of African-American, Native American, and Dutch descent.  Warwick graduated from East Orange High School in 1960.

Early career
Dee Dee Warwick sang with her sister Dionne Warwick and their aunt Cissy Houston in the New Hope Baptist Church Choir in Newark, New Jersey: eventually the three women formed the gospel trio the Gospelaires, who often performed with The Drinkard Singers, Warwick being a member of both groups.

At a performance by the Gospelaires with the Drinkard Singers at the Apollo Theater in 1959, the Warwick sisters were recruited by a record producer for session work and Dionne and Dee Dee Warwick, along with Doris Troy, subsequently became a prolific New York City area session singing team.

Dee Dee Warwick began to dabble in a solo career in 1963 cutting what is reportedly the earliest version of "You're No Good" for Jubilee Records, produced by Jerry Leiber and Mike Stoller, who later recorded Warwick on their own Tiger label with the 1964 single "Don't Think My Baby's Coming Back". In 1964 Warwick recorded a version of "I (Who Have Nothing)" for a tiny Buffalo, NY label (Hurd) - although the song's lyric was written by Leiber and Stoller, the duo did not participate in Warwick's recording - and Warwick also recorded as a member of Allison Gary and the Burners (as did Cissy Houston) with a release on Royo entitled "Darling".

Warwick made her network TV debut performing the gospel song "Children, Go Where I Send Thee" with her sister Dionne on NBC's Hullabaloo, which aired on March 30, 1965.  Warwick also performed on Shivaree, which aired on July 17, 1965; she sang "We're Doing Fine" and "I Want to Be with You".

Mercury recordings
In 1965, Warwick signed with Mercury Records, where she recorded with producer Ed Townsend for their subsidiary Blue Rock label, reaching the R&B Top 30 with "We're Doing Fine". It was on the Mercury label in 1966, that she had her biggest hit with "I Want to Be with You" from the Broadway show Golden Boy, a number 9 R&B hit, which just missed the pop Top 40 at number 41 (Nancy Wilson had reached number 54 with her version entitled "I Wanna Be with You" in 1964). The follow-up single was the original version of "I'm Gonna Make You Love Me" which, peaking at number 13 R&B and number 88 Pop, was not Warwick's biggest hit, but became her best known number by virtue of its later success as a duet between Diana Ross and The Supremes and The Temptations.

Warwick was regarded as one of the first openly lesbian performers within the music industry.

Atco recordings
Warwick continued to record for Mercury through the late 1960s. Although her occasional success in the R&B field—notably the 1969 Ed Townsend production of Foolish Fool—was enough for the label to wish to re-sign her in 1970, she signed with Atco at the invitation of Atlantic Records president Jerry Wexler himself, Wexler having admired Warwick's early session work.

Warwick made her first recordings for Atco in February 1970, cutting four tunes with Townsend. In an early indication of the disarray that Warwick's career experienced at Atlantic, these tracks were shelved and she was sent to Criteria Studios in Miami in April to work with producer Dave Crawford and fast-emerging studio band, The Dixie Flyers. The resultant Turning Around album yielded a Top Ten R&B hit with "She Didn't Know", but Warwick never had another album release or single in the R&B Top 20.

In October, she cut 10 tracks at Muscle Shoals, again with Crawford producing (along with Brad Shapiro). Only three singles were released with one, a remake of "Suspicious Minds", becoming Warwick's penultimate R&B hit in 1971. That summer, Crawford and Shapiro produced an eight-track session for Warwick at Pac-Three studios in Detroit. One track, "Everybody's Got to Believe in Something", was issued as a single - Warwick's last release on Atco despite two final sessions for the label in early 1972. Reflecting on her unrewarding Atco tenure, Warwick opined: "The problem was simply, that the company had a lot of other big female acts - like Aretha [Franklin] and Roberta [Flack] - and you get into a situation, where you don't get the right kind of material or production or promotion..."

Later career
Warwick returned to Mercury Records in 1973, but the following year she moved to Private Stock, where the 1975 single "Get Out of My Life" became her final charting song (number 73, R&B). That same year, she recorded for RCA Victor as DeDe Schwartz. After several years away from the recording studio, Warwick made her last recordings in the mid-1980s, releasing two albums: Dee Dee (Heritage Records, 1983), and Call Me (Sutra Records, 1984). In 1994, After living in Los Angeles for a number of years, she became a resident of Georgia.

Dee Dee Warwick received a Pioneer Award from the Rhythm and Blues Foundation in 1999. Recordings from both her Mercury and Atco years are available on CD. In late 2006, she returned to success singing background for her sister Dionne in concert, and was also part of the "Family First" song in the Tyler Perry film Daddy's Little Girls and its soundtrack album.

In January 2008, Dee Dee was featured in the title song of Dionne's gospel album Why We Sing. In February 2008, she sang background vocals for Dionne's one-woman show My Music and Me in Europe.

Death
Dee Dee struggled with diabetes for many years, and she was in failing health for some time. Her sister was with her when she died on October 18, 2008, in a nursing home in Essex County, New Jersey, aged 66.

Abuse allegations
The 2018 documentary film Whitney, directed by Kevin Macdonald, included allegations that Warwick had sexually molested Whitney Houston and her brother Gary, when Whitney was "at a young age" and Gary was around eight years old, while Warwick was in her mid to late 20s. Warwick's sister Dionne and Whitney Houston's mother Cissy both made statements wherein they expressed doubt regarding the truthfulness of the allegations. According to Whitney's friend, Robyn Crawford, in her book, A Song for You, she claimed Houston adored Warwick, even calling her "Auntie Dee Dee", although Dee Dee was actually her cousin. She also denied the allegations made against Warwick saying if she had abused her, she would have heard it from Whitney herself.

Discography

Albums
 I Want To Be With You / I'm Gonna Make You Love (1967)
 Foolish Fool (1969)
 Turning Around (1970)
 Dee Dee (1983)
 Call Me (1984)

Singles
1963: "You're No Good" (Jubilee) (No. 117 US)
1965: "Do It With All Your Heart" (Blue Rock) (No. 124 US)
1965: "We're Doing Fine" (Blue Rock) (No. 96 US, No. 28 R&B)
1966: "I Want To Be With You" (Mercury) (No. 41 US, No. 9 R&B)
1966: "I'm Gonna Make You Love Me" (Mercury) (No. 88 US, No. 13 R&B)
1967: "When Love Slips Away" (Mercury) (No. 92 US, No. 43 R&B)
1969: "That's Not Love" (Mercury) (No. 106 US, No. 42 R&B)
1969: "Ring of Bright Water" (Mercury) (No. 113 US)
1969: "Foolish Fool" (Mercury) (No. 57 US, No. 14 R&B)
1970: "She Didn't Know (She Kept On Talking)" (Atco) (No. 70 US, No. 9 R&B)
1970: "Cold Night In Georgia" (Atco) (No. 44 R&B)
1971: "Suspicious Minds" (Atco) (No. 80 US, No. 24 R&B)
1975: "Get Out Of My Life" (Private Stock) (No. 73 R&B)

References

External links
Dee Dee Warwick discography at AllMusic
 
 
"Soul singer Dee Dee Warwick dies at age 63", USA Today obituary.

1942 births
2008 deaths
American contraltos
American soul singers
Jubilee Records artists
Singers from New Jersey
Musicians from Newark, New Jersey
Atco Records artists
Culture of Newark, New Jersey
20th-century African-American women singers
The Drinkard Singers members